The names of China include the many contemporary and historical appellations given in various languages for the East Asian country known as Zhōngguó (/, "central country") in its national language, Standard Mandarin. China, the name in English for the country, was derived from Portuguese in the 16th century, and became common usage in the West in the subsequent centuries. It is believed to be a borrowing from Middle Persian, and some have traced it further back to Sanskrit.  It is also thought that the ultimate source of the name China is the Chinese word "Qin", the name of the dynasty that unified China but also existed as a state for many centuries prior. There are, however, other alternative suggestions for the origin of the word.

Chinese names for China, aside from Zhongguo, include Zhōnghuá (/, "central beauty"), Huáxià (/, "beautiful grandness"), Shénzhōu ("divine state") and Jiǔzhōu ("nine states"). Hàn (/) and Táng are common names given for the Chinese ethnicity, despite the Chinese nationality (Zhōnghuá Mínzú) not referencing any singular ethnicity. The People's Republic of China and Republic of China are the official names for the two contemporary sovereign states currently claiming sovereignty over the traditional area of China. "Mainland China" is used to refer to areas under the jurisdiction of the PRC, usually excluding Hong Kong and Macau.

There are also names for China used around the world that are derived from the languages of ethnic groups other than the Han; examples include "Cathay" from the Khitan language and "Tabgach" from Tuoba.

Sinitic names

Zhongguo

Pre-Qing

Zhōngguó (中國) is the most common Chinese name for China in modern times. The earliest appearance of this two-character term is on the bronze vessel He zun (dating to 1038–), during the early Western Zhou period. The phrase "zhong guo" came into common usage in the Warring States period (475–221 BCE), when it referred to the "Central States"; the states of the Yellow River Valley of the Zhou era, as distinguished from the tribal periphery. In later periods, however, Zhongguo was not used in this sense. Dynastic names were used for the state in Imperial China and concepts of the state aside from the ruling dynasty were little understood. Rather, the country was called by the name of the dynasty, such as "Han", "Tang", "Great Ming" (Da Ming ), "Great Qing" (Da Qing ), as the case might be. Until the 19th century when the international system came to require a common legal language, there was no need for a fixed or unique name. 

As early as the Spring and Autumn period, Zhongguo could be understood as either the domain of the capital or used to refer the Chinese civilization (zhuxia  "the various Xia" or zhuhua  "various Hua"), and the political and geographical domain that contained it, but Tianxia was the more common word for this idea. This developed into the usage of the Warring States period when, other than the cultural-civilizational community, it could be the geopolitical area of Chinese civilization, equivalent to Jiuzhou. In a more limited sense it could also refer to the Central Plain or the states of Zhao, Wei, and Han, etc., geographically central amongst the Warring States. Although Zhongguo could be used before the Song dynasty period to mean the transdynastic Chinese culture or civilization to which Chinese people belonged, it was in the Song dynasty when writers used Zhongguo as a term to describe the transdynastic entity with different dynastic names over time but having a set territory and defined by common ancestry, culture, and language.

There were different usages of the term Zhongguo in every period. It could refer to the capital of the emperor to distinguish it from the capitals of his vassals, as in Western Zhou. It could refer to the states of the Central Plain to distinguish them from states in outer regions. The Shi Jing defines Zhongguo as the capital region, setting it in apposition to the capital city.  During the Han dynasty, three usages of Zhongguo were common. The Records of the Grand Historian uses Zhongguo to denote the capital, and also uses the concept zhong ("center, central") and zhongguo to indicate the center of civilization: "There are eight famous mountains in the world: three in Man and Yi (the barbarian wilds), five in Zhōngguó." In this sense, the term Zhongguo is synonymous with Huáxià (/) and Zhōnghuá (/), names of China that were first authentically attested since Warring States period and Eastern Jin period, respectively.

From the Qin to Ming dynasty literati discussed Zhongguo as both a historical place or territory and as a culture. Writers of the Ming period in particular used the term as a political tool to express opposition to expansionist policies that incorporated foreigners into the empire. In contrast foreign conquerors typically avoided discussions of Zhongguo and instead defined membership in their empires to include both Han and non-Han peoples.

Qing
Zhongguo appeared in a formal international legal document for the first time during the Qing dynasty in the Treaty of Nerchinsk, 1689. The term was then used in communications with other states and in treaties. The Manchu rulers incorporated Inner Asian polities into their empire, and Wei Yuan, a statecraft scholar, distinguished the new territories from Zhongguo, which he defined as the 17 provinces of "China proper" plus the Manchu homelands in the Northeast. By the late 19th century the term had emerged as a common name for the whole country. The empire was sometimes referred to as Great Qing but increasingly as Zhongguo (see the discussion below).

Dulimbai Gurun is the Manchu name for China, with "Dulimbai" meaning "central" or "middle," and "Gurun" meaning "nation" or "state." The historian Zhao Gang writes that "not long after the collapse of the Ming, China [Zhongguo] became the equivalent of Great Qing (Da Qing)—another official title of the Qing state", and  "Qing and China became interchangeable official titles, and the latter often appeared as a substitute for the former in official documents."  The Qing dynasty referred to their realm as "Dulimbai Gurun" in Manchu. The Qing equated the lands of the Qing realm (including present day Manchuria, Xinjiang, Mongolia, Tibet and other areas) as "China" in both the Chinese and Manchu languages, defining China as a multi-ethnic state, rejecting the idea that China only meant Han areas; both Han and non-Han peoples were part of "China". Officials used "China" (though not exclusively) in official documents, international treaties, and foreign affairs, and the "Chinese language" (Manchu: Dulimbai gurun i bithe) referred to Chinese, Manchu, and Mongol languages, and the term "Chinese people" (Manchu: Dulimbai gurun i niyalma) referred to all Han, Manchus, and Mongol subjects of the Qing. Ming loyalist Han literati held to defining the old Ming borders as China and using "foreigner" to describe minorities under Qing rule such as the Mongols, as part of their anti-Qing ideology.

When the Qing conquered Dzungaria in 1759, they proclaimed that the new land was absorbed into Dulimbai Gurun in a Manchu language memorial. The Qing expounded on their ideology that they were bringing together the "outer" non-Han Chinese like the Inner Mongols, Eastern Mongols, Oirat Mongols, and Tibetans together with the "inner" Han Chinese, into "one family" united in the Qing state, showing that the diverse subjects of the Qing were all part of one family, the Qing used the phrase "" or "", to convey this idea of "unification" of the different peoples. A Manchu language version of a treaty with the Russian Empire concerning criminal jurisdiction over bandits called people from the Qing as "people of the Central Kingdom (Dulimbai Gurun)". In the Manchu official Tulisen's Manchu language account of his meeting with the Torghut Mongol leader Ayuki Khan, it was mentioned that while the Torghuts were unlike the Russians,  the  "people of the Central Kingdom" (dulimba-i gurun/) were like the Torghut Mongols, and the "people of the Central Kingdom" referred to the Manchus.

Mark Elliott noted that it was under the Qing that "China" transformed into a definition of referring to lands where the "state claimed sovereignty" rather than only the Central Plains area and its people by the end of the 18th century.

Elena Barabantseva also noted that the Manchu referred to all subjects of the Qing empire regardless of ethnicity as "Chinese", and used the term as a synonym for the entire Qing empire while using "Hàn rén" to refer only to the core area of the empire, with the entire empire viewed as multiethnic.

Joseph W. Esherick noted that while the Qing Emperors governed frontier non-Han areas in a different, separate system under the Lifanyuan and kept them separate from Han areas and administration, it was the Manchu Qing Emperors who expanded the definition of Zhongguo and made it "flexible" by using that term to refer to the entire Empire and using that term to other countries in diplomatic correspondence, while some Han Chinese subjects criticized their usage of the term and the Han literati Wei Yuan used Zhongguo only to refer to the seventeen provinces of China and three provinces of the east (Manchuria), excluding other frontier areas. Due to Qing using treaties clarifying the international borders of the Qing state, it was able to inculcate in the Chinese people a sense that China included areas such as Mongolia and Tibet due to education reforms in geography which made it clear where the borders of the Qing state were even if they didn't understand how the Chinese identity included Tibetans and Mongolians or understand what the connotations of being Chinese were. The Treaty of Nanking (1842) English version refers to "His Majesty the Emperor of China" while the Chinese refers both to "The Great Qing Emperor" (Da Qing Huangdi) and to Zhongguo as well. The Treaty of Tientsin (1858) has similar language.

In the late 19th century the reformer Liang Qichao argued in a famous passage that "our greatest shame is that our country has no name. The names that people ordinarily think of, such as Xia, Han, or Tang, are all the titles of bygone dynasties." He argued that the other countries of the world "all boast of their own state names, such as England and France, the only exception being the Central States." The Japanese term "Shina" was proposed as a basically neutral Western-influenced equivalent for "China". Liang and Chinese revolutionaries, such as Sun Yat-sen, who both lived extensive periods in Japan, used Shina extensively, and it was used in literature as well as by ordinary Chinese. But with the overthrow of the Qing in 1911, most Chinese dropped Shina as foreign and demanded that even Japanese replace it with Zhonghua minguo or simply Zhongguo. Liang went on to argue that the concept of tianxia had to be abandoned in favor of guojia, that is, "nation," for which he accepted the term Zhongguo. After the founding of the Chinese Republic in 1912, Zhongguo was also adopted as the abbreviation of Zhonghua minguo.

Qing official Zhang Deyi objected to the western European name "China" and said that China referred to itself as Zhonghua in response to a European who asked why Chinese used the term guizi to refer to all Europeans.

In the 20th century after the May Fourth Movement, educated students began to spread the concept of Zhōnghuá (/), which represented the people, including 56 minority ethnic groups and the Han Chinese, with a single culture identifying themselves as "Chinese". The Republic of China and the People's Republic of China both used the title "Zhōnghuá" in their official names. Thus, Zhōngguó became the common name for both governments, and "Zhōngguó rén" for their citizens, though Taiwanese people may reject being called as such. Overseas Chinese are referred to as huáqiáo (/), "Chinese overseas", or huáyì (/), "Chinese descendants" (i.e., Chinese children born overseas).

Middle Kingdom 
The English translation of Zhongguo as the "Middle Kingdom" entered European languages through the Portuguese in the 16th century and became popular in the mid-19th century. By the mid-20th century the term was thoroughly entrenched in the English language to reflect the Western view of China as the inwards-looking Middle Kingdom, or more accurately the Central Kingdom. Endymion Wilkinson points out that the Chinese were not unique in thinking of their country as central, although China was the only culture to use the concept for their name. The term Zhongguo was also not commonly used as a name for China until quite recently, nor did it mean the "Middle Kingdom" to the Chinese, or even have the same meaning throughout the course of history (see above).

"Zhōngguó" in different languages 
 Burmese:  
  (The Middle's Country/State)
  ("The Empire of the Center")
  ("Middle Empire" or "Middle Realm")
 English: Middle Kingdom, Central Kingdom
  ("The State of the Center")
  ("Middle Empire")
  ("Middle Empire")
  ("Middle Empire")
 Japanese: 
 Kazakh: 
 Korean: 
 Li: 
 Lojban: jugygu'e or .djunguos.
 Mongolian: , the official name for "China" used in Inner Mongolia
  ("The State of the Center")
  ("Central State")
  ("Middle Kingdom")
  ("The Empire of the Center")
  (The Middle's Country/State)
  (The Middle's Kingdom/Empire/Realm/State)
 Tibetan: , a PRC-era loanword from Mandarin; the normal Tibetan term for China (proper) is rgya nak (རྒྱ་ནག), lit. the "black country."
 
 
 
 (Zho guop)
 Zhuang: 

"Zhōnghuá" in different languages 
 Japanese: 
 Korean: 
 Kazakh: 
 Li: 
 Manchu: 
 Tibetan:  (krung hwa)
 
 
  (Zho huop)
 Zhuang: 

Huaxia 

The name Huaxia (/) is generally used as a sobriquet in Chinese text. Under traditional interpretations, it is the combination of two words which originally referred to the elegance of the traditional attire of the Han Chinese and the Confucian concept of rites.
 Hua which means "flowery beauty" (i.e. having beauty of dress and personal adornment ).
 Xia which means greatness or grandeur (i.e. having greatness of social customs/courtesy/polite manners and rites/ceremony ).

In the original sense, Huaxia refers to a confederation of tribes—living along the Yellow River—who were the ancestors of what later became the Han ethnic group in China. During the Warring States (475–221 BCE), the self-awareness of the Huaxia identity developed and took hold in ancient China.

Zhonghua minzu 

Zhonghua minzu is a term meaning "Chinese nation" in the sense of a multi-ethnic national identity. Though originally rejected by the PRC, it has been used officially since the 1980s for nationalist politics.

Tianchao and Tianxia 

Tianchao, translated as "heavenly dynasty" or "Celestial Empire;" and Tianxia translated as "under heaven," are both phrases that have been used to refer to China. These terms were usually used in the context of civil wars or periods of division, with the term Tianchao evoking the idea of the realm's ruling dynasty was appointed by heaven; or that whoever ends up reunifying China is said to have ruled Tianxia, or everything under heaven. This fits with the traditional Chinese theory of rulership in which the emperor was nominally the political leader of the entire world and not merely the leader of a nation-state within the world. Historically the term was connected to the later Zhou Dynasty (c. 1046–256 BCE), especially the Spring and Autumn period (eighth to fourth century BCE) and the Warring States period (from there to 221 BCE, when China was reunified by the Qin state). The phrase Tianchao continues to see use on Chinese internet discussion boards, in reference to China.

The phrase Tianchao was first translated into English and French in the early 19th century, appearing in foreign publicans and diplomatic correspondences, with the translated phrase "Celestial Empire" occasionally used to refer to China. During this period, the term celestial was used by some to refer to the subjects of the Qing dynasty in a non-prejudicial manner, derived from the term "Celestial Empire". However, the term celestial was also used in a pejorative manner during the 19th century, in reference to Chinese immigrants in Australasia and North America. The translated phrase has largely fallen into disuse in the 20th century.

Translations for Tianxia include:
 Russian: Поднебесная (Podnebésnaya; lit. "under the heaven")

Jiangshan and Heshan 
Jiangshan and Heshan literally mean "rivers and mountains". This term is quite similar in usage to Tianxia, and simply refers to the entire world, and here the most prominent features of which being rivers and mountains. The use of this term is also common as part of the phrase Jiangshan sheji (lit. "rivers and mountains, soil and grain"), suggesting the need to implement good governance.

Jiuzhou 

The name Jiuzhou means "nine provinces". Widely used in pre-modern Chinese text, the word originated during the middle of Warring States period of China (c. 400–221 BCE). During that time, the Yellow River region was divided into nine geographical regions; thus this name was coined. Some people also attribute this word to the mythical hero and king Yu the Great, who, in the legend, divided China into nine provinces during his reign. (Consult Zhou for more information.)

Shenzhou 
This name means Divine Realm or Divine Land and comes from the same period as Jiuzhou meaning "nine provinces". It was thought that the world was divided into nine major states, one of which is Shenzhou, which is in turn divided into nine smaller states, one of which is Jiuzhou mentioned above.

Sihai 

This name, Four Seas, is sometimes used to refer to the world, or simply China, which is perceived as the civilized world. It came from the ancient notion that the world is flat and surrounded by sea.

Han 

The name Han (/) derives from the Han dynasty (206 BC–AD 220), who presided over China's first "golden age". The Han dynasty collapsed in 220 and was followed by a long period of disorder, including Three Kingdoms, Sixteen Kingdoms, and Southern and Northern dynasties periods. During these periods, various non-Han ethnic groups established various dynasties in northern China. It was during this period that people began to use the term "Han" to refer to the natives of North China, who (unlike the minorities) were the descendants of the subjects of the Han dynasty.

During the Yuan dynasty, subjects of the empire was divided into four classes: Mongols, Semu or "Colour-eyeds", Hans, and "Southerns". Northern Chinese were called Han, which was considered to be the highest class of Chinese. This class "Han" includes all ethnic groups in northern China including Khitan and Jurchen who have in most part sinicized during the last two hundreds years. The name "Han" became popularly accepted.

During the Qing dynasty, the Manchu rulers also used the name Han to distinguish the natives of the Central Plains from the Manchus. After the fall of the Qing government, the Han became the name of a nationality within China. Today the term "Han Persons", often rendered in English as Han Chinese, is used by the People's Republic of China to refer to the most populous of the 56 officially recognized ethnic groups of China. The "Han Chinese" are simply referred to as "Chinese" by some.

Tang 

The name Tang comes from the Tang dynasty (618–690, 705–907) that presided over China's second golden age. It was during the Tang dynasty that South China was finally and fully Sinicized; Tang would become synonymous with China in Southern China and it is usually Southern Chinese who refer to themselves as "People of Tang". For example, the sinicization and rapid development of Guangdong during the Tang period would lead the Cantonese to refer to themselves as Tong-yan in Cantonese, while China is called Tong-saan. Chinatowns worldwide, often dominated by Southern Chinese, also became referred to Tang people's Street (Cantonese: Tong-yan-gaai).  The Cantonese term Tongsan (Tang mountain) is recorded in Old Malay as one of the local terms for China, along with the Sanskrit-derived Cina. It is still used in Malaysia today, usually in a derogatory sense.

Among Taiwanese, Tang mountain (Min-Nan: Tn̂g-soaⁿ) has been used, for example, in the saying, "has Tangshan father, no Tangshan mother". This refers how the Han people crossing the Taiwan Strait in the 17th and 18th centuries were mostly men, and that many of their offspring would be through intermarriage with Taiwanese aborigine women.

In Ryukyuan, karate was originally called tii (hand) or karatii (Tang hand) because  too-nu-kuku or kara-nu-kuku was a common Ryukyuan name for China; it was changed to karate (open hand) to appeal to Japanese people after the First Sino-Japanese War.

Zhu Yu, who wrote during the Northern Song dynasty, noted that the name "Han" was first used by the northwestern 'barbarians' to refer to China while the name "Tang" was first used by the southeastern 'barbarians' to refer to China, and these terms subsequently influenced the local Chinese terminology. During the Mongol invasions of Japan, the Japanese distinguished between the "Han" of northern China, who, like the Mongols and Koreans, were not to be taken prisoner, and the Newly Submitted Army of southern China whom they called "Tang", who would be enslaved instead.

Dalu and Neidi 
Dàlù (/), literally "big continent" or "mainland" in this context, is used as a short form of Zhōnggúo Dàlù (/, Mainland China), excluding (depending on the context) Hong Kong and Macau, and/or Taiwan. This term is used in official context in both the mainland and Taiwan, when referring to the mainland as opposed to Taiwan. In certain contexts, it is equivalent to the term Neidi (literally "the inner land"). While Neidi generally refers to the interior as opposed to a particular coastal or border location, or the coastal or border regions generally, it is used in Hong Kong specifically to mean mainland China excluding Hong Kong, Macau and Taiwan. Increasingly, it is also being used in an official context within mainland China, for example in reference to the separate judicial and customs jurisdictions of mainland China on the one hand and Hong Kong, Macau and Taiwan on the other.

The term Neidi is also often used in Xinjiang and Tibet to distinguish the eastern provinces of China from the minority-populated, autonomous regions of the west.

Official names

People's Republic of China 

The name New China has been frequently applied to China by the Chinese Communist Party as a positive political and social term contrasting pre-1949 China (the establishment of the PRC) and the new name of the socialist state, Zhōnghuá Rénmín Gònghéguó (in the older postal romanization, Chunghwa Jenmin Konghokuo) or the "People's Republic of China" in English, was adapted from the CCP's short-lived Chinese Soviet Republic in 1931. This term is also sometimes used by writers outside mainland China. The PRC was known to many in the West during the Cold War as "Communist China" or "Red China" to distinguish it from the Republic of China which is commonly called "Taiwan", "Nationalist China" or "Free China". In some contexts, particularly in economics, trade, and sports, "China" is often used to refer to mainland China to the exclusion of Hong Kong, Macau and Taiwan.

The official name of the People's Republic of China in various official languages and scripts:
 Simplified Chinese:  – Official language and script, used in mainland China, Singapore and Malaysia
 Traditional Chinese:  – Official script in Hong Kong and Macau, and commonly used in Taiwan (ROC)
 English: People's Republic of China – Official in Hong Kong
 Kazakh: As used within the Republic of Kazakhstan, Қытай Халық Республикасы (in Cyrillic script), Qıtay Xalıq Respwblïkası (in Latin script),  (in Arabic script); as used within the People's Republic of China,  (in Arabic script), Жұңxуа Халық Республикасы (in Cyrillic script), Juñxwa Xalıq Respwblïkası (in Latin script). The Cyrillic script is the predominant script in the Republic of Kazakhstan, while the Arabic script is normally used for the Kazakh language in the People's Republic of China.
 Korean:  (Junghwa Inmin Gonghwaguk) – Used in Yanbian Prefecture (Jilin) and Changbai County (Liaoning)
 Mongolian:  (Bügüde nayiramdaqu dumdadu arad ulus) – Official in Inner Mongolia; Бүгд Найрамдах Хятад Ард Улс (Bügd Nairamdakh Khyatad Ard Uls) – used in Mongolia
 Portuguese: República Popular da China – Official in Macau
  – Official in PRC's Tibet
  – Official in Tibet Government-in-Exile
  (Jungxua Xelq Jumhuriyiti) – Official in Xinjiang
 Yi:  (Zho huop rep mip gop hop guop) – Official in Liangshan (Sichuan) and several Yi-designated autonomous counties
 Zaiwa:  – Official in Dehong (Yunnan)
 Zhuang: Cunghvaz Yinzminz Gunghozgoz (Old orthography: Cuŋƅvaƨ Yinƨminƨ Guŋƅoƨ) – Official in Guangxi

The official name of the People's Republic of China in major neighboring countries official languages and scripts:
 Japanese:  (Chūka Jinmin Kyōwakoku) – Used in Japan
 Russian:  (Kitayskaya Narodnaya Respublika) – Used in Russia and Central Asia
 Hindi:  (Cīnī Janvādī Gaṇrājya) – Used in India
 Urdu:  (Awami Jamhoriya Cheen) – Used in Pakistan
 Burmese:  (Tarotepyishusammataninengan) – Used in Myanmar
 Vietnamese:  – Used in Vietnam
 Thai:  (Satharanarat Prachachon Chin) – Used in Thailand
 Khmer:  – Used in Cambodia
 Lao:  (Sathalanalat Paxaxon Chin) – Used in Laos
 Nepali:  (Jana Gaṇatāntrika Cīna) – Used in Nepal

Republic of China 

In 1912, China adopted its official name, Chunghwa Minkuo (rendered in pinyin Zhōnghuá Mínguó) or in English as the "Republic of China", which also has sometimes been referred to as "Republican China" or the "Republican Era", in contrast to the empire it replaced, or as "Nationalist China", after the ruling Chinese Nationalist Party (Kuomintang).  (Chunghwa) is a term that pertains to "China" while  (Minkuo), literally "People's State" or "Peopledom", stands for "republic". The name had stemmed from the party manifesto of Tongmenghui in 1905, which says the four goals of the Chinese revolution was "to expel the Manchu rulers, to revive Chunghwa, to establish a Republic, and to distribute land equally among the people.()." The convener of Tongmenghui and Chinese revolutionary leader Sun Yat-sen proposed the name Chunghwa Minkuo as the assumed name of the new country when the revolution succeeded.

With the separation from mainland China in 1949 as a result of the Chinese Civil War, the territory of the Republic of China has largely been confined to the island of Taiwan and some other small islands. Thus, the country is often simply referred to as simply "Taiwan", although this may not be perceived as politically neutral. (See Taiwan Independence.) Amid the hostile rhetoric of the Cold War, the government and its supporters sometimes referred to itself as "Free China" or "Liberal China", in contrast to People's Republic of China (which was historically called the "Bandit-occupied Area" by the ROC). In addition, the ROC, due to pressure from the PRC, was forced to use the name "Chinese Taipei" whenever it participates in international forums or most sporting events such as the Olympic Games.

Taiwanese politician Mei Feng had criticised the official English name of the state "Republic of China" fails to translate the Chinese character "Min" (English: people) according to Sun Yat-sen's original interpretations, while the name should instead be translated as "the People's Republic of China," which confuses with the current official name of China under communist control. To avoid confusion, the Chen Shui-ban led DPP administration  began to put an aside of "Taiwan" next to the nation's official name since 2005.

The official name of the Republic of China in various official languages and scripts:
 English: Republic of China – Official in Hong Kong, commonly used by the United States until 1979, Chinese Taipei – official designation in several international organizations (International Olympic Committee, FIFA, Miss Universe, World Health Organization), Separate Customs Territory of Taiwan, Penghu, Kinmen, and Matsu – World Trade Organization, Governing authorities on Taiwan – Official name used by the United States from 1979
 Kazakh: As used within Republic of Kazakhstan, Қытай Республикасы (in Cyrillic script), Qıtay Respwblïkası (in Latin script),  (in Arabic script); as used within the People's Republic of China, Жұңxуа Республикасы (in Cyrillic script), Juñxwa Respwblïkası (in Latin script),  (in Arabic script). The Cyrillic script is the predominant script in the Republic of Kazakhstan, while the Arabic script is normally used for the Kazakh language in the People's Republic of China.
 Korean:  (Junghwa Minguk) – Official in Yanbian Korean Autonomous Prefecture
 Manchurian:  (Dulimbai irgen' gurun)
 Mongolian:  Дундад иргэн улс (Dumdadu irgen ulus) – Official for its history name before 1949 in Inner Mongolia and Mongolia; Бүгд Найрамдах Хятад Улс (Bügd Nairamdakh Khyatad Uls) – used in Mongolia for Roc in Taiwan
 Portuguese: República da China – Official in Macau, Formosa – former name
 ,  – Official in PRC's Tibet
  – Official in Tibet Government-in-Exile
  – Official in Xinjiang
 Yi:  (Zho huop mip guop) – Official in Liangshan (Sichuan) and several Yi-designated autonomous counties
 Zaiwa:  – Official in Dehong (Yunnan)
 Zhuang: Cunghvaz Mingoz (Old orthography: Cuŋƅvaƨ Minƨƅoƨ) – Official in Guangxi

The official name of the Republic of China in major neighboring countries official languages and scripts:

 Japanese:  (Chūka Minkoku) – Used in Japan
 Korean:  (Junghwa Minguk) – Used in Korea
 Russian:  (Kitayskaya Respublika) – Used in Russia and Central Asia
 Hindi:  (Cīna Gaṇrājya) – Used in India
 Urdu:  (Jumhūriyā Cīn) – Used in Pakistan
 Burmese:  (Tarotesammataninengan) – Used in Myanmar
 Thai:  (Satharanarat Chin) – Used in Thailand
 Khmer:  – Used in Cambodia
 Lao:  (Sathalanalat Chin) – Used in Laos
 Nepali:  (Gaṇatāntrika Cīna) – Used in Nepal

Names in non-Chinese records 
Names used in the parts of Asia, especially East and Southeast Asia, are usually derived directly from words in one of the languages of China. Those languages belonging to a former dependency (tributary) or Chinese-influenced country have an especially similar pronunciation to that of Chinese. Those used in Indo-European languages, however, have indirect names that came via other routes and may bear little resemblance to what is used in China.

Chin, China 

English, most Indo-European languages, and many others use various forms of the name China and the prefix "Sino-" or "Sin-" from the Latin Sina. Europeans had knowledge of a country known in Greek as Thina or Sina from the early period; the Periplus of the Erythraean Sea from perhaps the first century AD recorded a country known as Thin (θίν).  The English name for "China" itself is derived from Middle Persian (Chīnī ). This modern word "China" was first used by Europeans starting with Portuguese explorers of the 16th century – it was first recorded in 1516 in the journal of the Portuguese explorer Duarte Barbosa. The journal was translated and published in England in 1555.

The traditional etymology, proposed in the 17th century by Martin Martini and supported by later scholars such as Paul Pelliot and Berthold Laufer, is that the word "China" and its related terms are ultimately derived from the polity known as Qin that unified China to form the Qin Dynasty (Old Chinese: *dzin) in the 3rd century BC, but existed as a state on the furthest west of China since the 9th century BC. This is still the most commonly held theory, although the etymology is still a matter of debate according to the Oxford English Dictionary, and many other suggestions have been mooted.

The existence of the word Cīna  in ancient Indian texts was noted by the Sanskrit scholar Hermann Jacobi who pointed out its use in the Book 2 of Arthashastra with reference to silk and woven cloth produced by the country of Cīna, although textual analysis suggests that Book 2 may not have been written long before 150 AD. The word is also found in other Sanskrit texts such as the Mahābhārata and the Laws of Manu.  The Indologist Patrick Olivelle argued that the word Cīnā may not have been known in India before the first century BC, nevertheless he agreed that it probably referred to Qin but thought that the word itself was derived from a Central Asian language. Some Chinese and Indian scholars argued for the state of Jing (another name for Chu) as the likely origin of the name.  Another suggestion, made by Geoff Wade, is that the  Cīnāh in Sanskrit texts refers to an ancient kingdom centered in present-day Guizhou, called Yelang, in the south Tibeto-Burman highlands.  The inhabitants referred to themselves as Zina according to Wade.

The term China can also be used to refer to:
 a modern state, indicating the People's Republic of China (PRC) or the Republic of China (ROC), where recognized;
 "Mainland China" (/, Zhōngguó Dàlù in Mandarin), which is the territory of the PRC minus the two special administrative regions of Hong Kong and Macau;
 "China proper", a term used to refer to the historical heartlands of China without peripheral areas like Manchuria, Inner Mongolia, Tibet, and Xinjiang

In economic contexts, "Greater China" (/, dà Zhōnghuá dìqū) is intended to be a neutral and non-political way to refer to Mainland China, Hong Kong, Macau and Taiwan.

Sinologists usually use "Chinese" in a more restricted sense, akin to the classical usage of Zhongguo, to the Han ethnic group, which makes up the bulk of the population in China and of the overseas Chinese.

List of derived terms 
Afrikaans: Sjina, spelling now obsolete and spelled as China (pronunciation is the same)
Albanian: Kinë
Amharic: Chayna (from English)
Armenian: Չինաստան
Assamese: 
Azeri: Çin
Basque: Txina
Bengali: 
Burma: တရုတ်
Catalan: Xina
Chinese:  Zhīnà (obsolete and considered offensive due to historical Japanese usage; originated from early Chinese translations of Buddhist texts in Sanskrit)
 Chinese:  Zhèndàn transcription of the Sanskrit/Pali "Cīnasthāna" in the Buddhist texts.
Czech: Čína
Danish: Kina
Dutch: China
English: China
Esperanto: Ĉinujo or Ĉinio, or Ĥinujo (archaic)
Estonian: Hiina
Filipino: Tsina
Finnish: Kiina
French: Chine
Galician: China
Georgian: ჩინეთი
Greek: Κίνα (Kína)
Gujarati: Cīn  (IPA )
Hungarian: Kína
Icelandic: Kína
Indonesian: Cina
Interlingua: China
Irish: An tSín
Italian: Cina
Japanese: Shina – considered offensive in China, now largely obsolete in Japan and avoided out of deference to China (the name Chūgoku  is used instead); See Shina (word) and kotobagari.
Javanese:  Cina (low speech level);  Cinten (high speech level)
Kapampangan: Sina
Khmer: 
Korean: Jina
Latvian: Ķīna
Lithuanian: Kinija
Macedonian: Кина (Kina)
Malay: Cina 
Malayalam: Cheenan/Cheenathi
Maltese: Ċina
Marathi: Cīn  (IPA )
Nepali: Cīn  (IPA )
Norwegian: Kina
Pahlavi: Čīnī
Persian: Chīn 
Polish: Chiny
Portuguese: China
Romanian: China
Serbo-Croatian: Kina or 
Sinhala: Chinaya චීනය
Slovak: Čína
Spanish: China
Somali:  Shiinaha 
Swedish: Kina
Tamil: Cīnam
Thai: 
Tibetan: Rgya Nag
Turkish: Çin
Vietnamese: Chấn Đán (震旦) ( or Chi Na (支那) (in Buddhist texts).
Welsh: Tsieina
Yiddish: כינע Khine

Seres, Ser, Serica

Sēres (Σῆρες) was the Ancient Greek and Roman name for the northwestern part of China and its inhabitants. It meant "of silk," or "land where silk comes from." The name is thought to derive from the Chinese word for silk, sī (/; Middle Chinese sɨ, Old Chinese *slɯ, per Zhengzhang). It is itself at the origin of the Latin for silk, "sērica".  See the main article Serica for more details.

 Ancient Greek: Σῆρες Seres, Σηρικός Serikos
 Latin: Serica
 Old Irish: Seiria, as seen in Dúan in chóicat cest

This may be a back formation from sērikos (σηρικός), "made of silk", from sēr (σήρ), "silkworm", in which case Sēres is "the land where silk comes from."

Sinae, Sin  

Sīnae was an ancient Greek and Roman name for some people who dwelt south of the Seres (Serica) in the eastern extremity of the habitable world. References to the Sinae include mention of a city that the Romans called Sēra Mētropolis, which may be modern Chang'an. The Latin prefixes Sino- and Sin- as well as words such as Sinica, which are traditionally used to refer to China or the Chinese, came from Sīnae. It is generally thought that Chīna, Sīna and Thīna are variants that ultimately derived from Qin, which was the westernmost state in China that eventually formed the Qin Dynasty. There are however other opinions on its etymology (See section on China above). Henry Yule thought that this term may have come to Europe through the Arabs, who made the China of the farther east into Sin, and perhaps sometimes into Thin. Hence the Thin of the author of the Periplus of the Erythraean Sea, who appears to be the first extant writer to employ the name in this form; hence also the Sinæ and Thinae of Ptolemy.

Some denied that Ptolemy's Sinae really represented the Chinese as Ptolemy called the country Sērice and the capital Sēra, but regarded them as distinct from Sīnae. Marcian of Heraclea (a condenser of Ptolemy) tells us that the "nations of the Sinae lie at the extremity of the habitable world, and adjoin the eastern Terra incognita". The 6th century Cosmas Indicopleustes refers to a "country of silk" called Tzinista, which is understood as referring to China, beyond which "there is neither navigation nor any land to inhabit". It seems probable that the same region is meant by both. According to Henry Yule, Ptolemy's misrendering of the Indian Sea as a closed basin meant that Ptolemy must also have misplaced the Chinese coast, leading to the misconception of Serica and Sina as separate countries.

In the Hebrew Bible, there is a mention of a faraway country Sinim in the Book of Isaiah  49:12 which some had assumed to be a reference to China. In Genesis 10:17, a tribes called the Sinites were said to be the descendants of Canaan, the son of Ham, but they are usually considered to be a different people, probably from the northern part of Lebanon.

 Arabic: Ṣīn 
 French/English (prefix of adjectives): Sino- (i.e. Sino-American), Sinitic (the Chinese language family).
 Hebrew: Sin

Cathay 

This group of names derives from Khitan, an ethnic group that originated in Manchuria and conquered parts of Northern China early tenth century forming the Liao dynasty, and later in the twelfth century dominated Central Asia as the Kara Khitan Khanate. Due to long period of domination of Northern China and then Central Asia by these nomadic conquerors, the name Khitan become associated with China to the people in and around the northwestern region.  Muslim historians referred to the Kara Khitan state as Khitay or Khitai; they may have adopted this form of "Khitan" via the Uyghurs of Kocho in whose language the final -n or -ń became -y. The name was then introduced to medieval and early modern Europe through Islamic and Russian sources. In English and in several other European languages, the name "Cathay" was used in the translations of the adventures of Marco Polo, which used this word for northern China.  Words related to Khitay are still used in many Turkic and Slavic languages to refer to China. However, its use by Turkic speakers within China, such as the Uyghurs, is considered pejorative by the Chinese authority who tried to ban it.

 Belarusian: Кітай (Kitay)
 Bulgarian: Китай (Kitay)
 Buryat: Хитад (Khitad)
 Classical Mongolian: Kitad 
 English: Cathay
French: Cathay
 Kazakh: Қытай (Qıtay)
 Kazan Tatar: Кытай (Qıtay)
 Kyrgyz: Кытай (Kıtaj)
 
 Mongolian: Хятад (Khyatad) (the name for China used in the State of Mongolia)
 Polish: Kitaj (now archaic)
 Portuguese: Catai
 Russian: Китай (Kitay)
 Serbo-Croatian: Kitaj or Китај (now archaic; from Russian)
 Slovene: 
 Spanish: Catay 
 Tajik: Хитой ("Khitoy")
 Turkmen: Hytaý ("Хытай")
 Ukrainian: Китай (Kytai)
 
 Uzbek: Xitoy (Хитой)

There is no evidence that either in the 13th or 14th century, Cathayans, i.e. Chinese, travelled officially to Europe, but it is possible that some did, in unofficial capacities, at least in the 13th century. During the campaigns of Hulagu (the grandson of Genghis Khan) in Persia (1256–65), and the reigns of his successors, Chinese engineers were employed on the banks of the Tigris, and Chinese astrologers and physicians could be consulted. Many diplomatic communications passed between the Hulaguid Ilkhans and Christian princes. The former, as the great khan's liegemen, still received from him their seals of state; and two of their letters which survive in the archives of France exhibit the vermilion impressions of those seals in Chinese characters—perhaps affording the earliest specimen of those characters to reach western Europe.

Tabgach 
The word Tabgach came from the metatheses of Tuoba (*t'akbat), a dominant tribe of the Xianbei and the surname of the Northern Wei emperors in the 5th century before sinicisation. It referred to Northern China, which was dominated by part-Xianbei, part-Han people.

 Byzantine Greek: Taugats
 Orhon Kok-Turk: Tabgach (variations Tamgach)

Nikan 
Nikan (Manchu: , means "Han/China")  was a Manchu ethnonym of unknown origin that referred specifically to the ethnic group known in English as the Han Chinese; the stem of this word was also conjugated as a verb, nikara(-mbi), and used to mean "to speak the Chinese language." Since Nikan was essentially an ethnonym and referred to a group of people (i.e., a nation) rather than to a political body (i.e., a state), the correct translation of "China (proper)" into the Manchu language is Nikan gurun, literally the "Nikan state" or "country of the Nikans" (i.e., country of the Hans). 

This exonym for the Han Chinese is also used in the Daur language, in which it appears as Niaken ( or ). As in the case of the Manchu language, the Daur word Niaken is essentially an ethnonym, and the proper way to refer to the country of the Han Chinese (i.e., "China" in a cultural sense) is Niaken gurun, while niakendaaci- is a verb meaning "to talk in Chinese."

Kara
An identical name was used by the ancient and medieval Japanese to refer to the country that is now known as Korea, and many Japanese historians and linguists believe that the word "Kara" referring to China and/or Korea may have derived from a metonymic extension of the appellation of the ancient city-states of Gaya.

The Japanese word karate (lit. "empty hand") is derived from the Okinawan word karatii (lit. "Chinese/Asian/foreign hand/trick/means/method/style") and refers to Okinawan martial arts; the character for kara was changed to remove the connotation of the style originating in China.

Morokoshi 
This obsolete Japanese name for China is believed to have derived from a kun reading of the Chinese compound  Zhūyuè or 
Bǎiyuè as "all the Yue" or "the hundred (i.e., myriad, various, or numerous) Yue," which was an ancient Chinese name for the societies of the regions that are now southern China.

The Japanese common noun tōmorokoshi, which refers to maize, appears to contain an element cognate with the proper noun formerly used in reference to China. Although tōmorokoshi is traditionally written with Chinese characters that literally mean "jade Shu millet," the etymology of the Japanese word appears to go back to "Tang morokoshi," in which "morokoshi" was the obsolete Japanese name for China as well as the Japanese word for sorghum, which seems to have been introduced into Japan from China.

Mangi

From Chinese Manzi (southern barbarians). The division of North China and South China under the Jin dynasty and Song dynasty weakened the idea of a unified China, and it was common for non-Han peoples to refer to the politically disparate North and South by different names for some time. While Northern China was called Cathay, Southern China was referred to as Mangi. Manzi often appears in documents of the Mongol-led Yuan dynasty as a disparaging term for Southern China. The Mongols also called Southern Chinese Nangkiyas or Nangkiyad, and considered them ethnically distinct from North Chinese. The word Manzi reached the Western world as Mangi (as used by Marco Polo), which is a name commonly found on medieval maps. Note however that the Chinese themselves considered Manzi to be derogatory and never used it as a self-appellation. Some early scholars believed Mangi to be a corruption of the Persian Machin and Arabic Māṣīn, which may be a mistake as these two forms are derived from the Sanskrit Maha Chin meaning Great China.

Chinese: Manzi
Latin: Mangi

See also 

 Little China (ideology)
 Chinese romanization
 List of country name etymologies
 Names of the Qing dynasty
 Names of India
 Names of Japan
 Names of Korea
 Names of Vietnam
 Île-de-France, similar French concept

References

Citations

Sources 

 
 
 
 
 
 
 
 

 
 

 

 
China
China
Articles containing Mongolian script text
Geographical naming disputes